Legislative elections were held in Honduras on 28 October 1934.

Results

References

Elections in Honduras
Honduras
1934 in Honduras
October 1934 events
Election and referendum articles with incomplete results